Malcolm Johnson may refer to:

 Malcolm Johnson (administrator) (born 1947), British director of the ITU Telecommunication Standardization Bureau
 Malcolm Johnson (journalist) (1904–1976), American journalist
 Malcolm Johnson (fullback) (born 1992), American football full back and former tight end
 Malcolm Johnson (wide receiver)  (born 1977), American football wide receiver